Değirmendere is a municipal town in the Gölcük district of Kocaeli Province, Turkey. The town is located on the south coast of Izmit Bay. The quarters of Değirmendere are named as Yüzbaşılar, Yukarı Değirmendere (Upper Değirmendere), Merkez, and Kuruçeşme. The town lies between Gölcük and Halidere, and it was the epicenter of the 1999 Marmara earthquake that almost wiped out the town as well as neighboring towns. Değirmendere is well known for its hazelnuts, sweet cherries, and public cultural activities.

Towns in Turkey
Populated places in Kocaeli Province